Mali station, is a station of Line 14 of the Guangzhou Metro. It started operations on 28 December 2018.

The station has 2 elevated side platforms. Platform 1 is for trains heading to Dongfeng, whilst platform 2 is for trains heading to Jiahewanggang.

Exits
There are 2 exits, lettered A and B. Both exits are accessible and are located on Guangcong No. 9 Road.

Gallery

References

 Railway stations in China opened in 2018
 Guangzhou Metro stations in Baiyun District